Blockchain Global Ltd. is a Bitcoin mining and management consulting company headquartered in Melbourne, Australia. Founded as Bitcoin Group, after attempting to become the first digital currency company to launch an IPO without the so-called 'backdoor listing', the company expanded its focus into consulting and corporate fraud and extortion prevention.

History 
Bitcoin Group was founded in 2014 as a bitcoin mining company as a result of a partnership between Sam Lee, Allan Guo and Vincent Vu.

, with seven bitcoin mining locations in Australia, China, and Thailand, Bitcoin Group's mining operation generated 6.2 petahashes, approximately 15.7% of the Global Hash Power.  The company made a submission to the Australian Senate’s Economics References Committee for their 2015 inquiry into digital currencies. The submission advised the committee that while the company did not agree with the ruling on the GST treatment of digital currencies by the Australian Taxation Office, its ambitions would have been more difficult to realize without the regulatory clarity that it provided.

Bitcoin Group announced that it would pursue an initial public offering (IPO) on the Australian Securities Exchange (ASX) in October 2014. The attempt was delayed by two stop orders from the Australian Securities and Investments Commission (ASIC). Following ASIC's request for an Independent Expert Report, the company undertook a third attempt to list on the ASX through an IPO, planning to issue 100 million new shares by January 2016 and thereby raise $20 million at 20¢ a share and achieve a market capitalisation of $32.9 million based on 164,870,930 shares on completion of the offer. The company said the capital report by an independent accounting firm which the exchange had required did not take into account the expected rise in bitcoin prices following block halving in July 2016.

In August 2016 Bitcoin Group rebranded as Blockchain Global to reflect a broadened focus including management consulting and business incubation. The company later developed the blockchain exchange platform ACX.io; in February 2017 it reached an agreement with Digital X to take over the function of that company's blockchain exchange platform, Digital X Direct. ACX subsequently ceased operations abruptly with customers unable to access their assets.

References

External links 
Official website

Bitcoin companies
Australian companies established in 2014
Companies based in Melbourne